The Joe River is a  tributary of the Red River of the North that flows through Minnesota in the United States and Manitoba in Canada.  Via the Red River, Lake Winnipeg, and the Nelson River, it is part of the Hudson Bay watershed.

See also
List of rivers of Minnesota
List of rivers of Manitoba

References

External links
Minnesota Watersheds

USGS Hydrologic Unit Map - State of Minnesota (1974)

Rivers of Kittson County, Minnesota
Rivers of Minnesota
Rivers of Manitoba
International rivers of North America
Tributaries of Hudson Bay